28 is an electronic music album by Aoki Takamasa and Tujiko Noriko, released on Fat Cat Records in 2005. Reviewers have compared Noriko's vocals and Takamasa's production to the Vespertine-era work of Björk and Matmos, with the track "Vinyl Words" particularly highlighted.

Track listing

Production
All tracks written, performed, and produced by Takamasa and Noriko.

Equipment
Mac PowerBook G4 1Ghz Laptop
Neumann TLM 103 Microphone & MOTU 2408 Soundcard
Korg Z1 Synthesizer 
Logic Pro 6.4.1 and Max/MSP 4.2.1 Software

References

External links
 Artists' page at Fat Cat Records
 Video of "Vinyl Words"

2005 albums
FatCat Records albums